Sujith Sanjaya Perera  is a Sri Lankan politician and a member of the Parliament of Sri Lanka. He was elected from Kegalle District in 2015. He is a Member of the United National Party. He is the son of Vincent Perera.

He was educated at Nalanda College, Colombo

References

 Sujith Sanjaya Perera
 The Gazette of the Democratic Socialist Republic of Sri Lanka No. 2187/26 - SATURDAY, AUGUST 08, 2020

Members of the Sabaragamuwa Provincial Council
Provincial councillors of Sri Lanka
Living people
Members of the 15th Parliament of Sri Lanka
Members of the 16th Parliament of Sri Lanka
Year of birth missing (living people)
Alumni of Nalanda College, Colombo
Samagi Jana Balawegaya politicians